Elliot Ekmark (born 29 January 2002) is a Swedish professional ice hockey centre for IF Björklöven in the HockeyAllsvenskan (Allsv) on loan from Linköping HC of the Swedish Hockey League (SHL).

Playing career
Ekmark made his professional debut during the 2019–20 season where he appeared in four games for Linköping HC. He was drafted in the seventh round, 198th overall, by the Florida Panthers in the 2020 NHL Entry Draft.

International play
Ekmark will represent Sweden at the 2022 World Junior Ice Hockey Championships.

Career statistics

Regular season and playoffs

International

References

External links
 

2002 births
Living people
IF Björklöven players
Florida Panthers draft picks
Linköping HC players
Sportspeople from Linköping
Swedish ice hockey centres
Västerviks IK players